Callum Skinner (born 20 August 1992) is a British former track cyclist. He won the silver medal in the individual sprint at the 2016 Summer Olympics, and was a member of the British team that won gold in the team sprint.

Early life
Skinner was born to mother Judith and father Scott, the elder of two boys with a younger brother, Roy in Glasgow, Scotland. He moved to Bruntsfield, Edinburgh at the age of 12 and attended James Gillespie's High School. His academic career was hampered by dyslexia. He took up cycling in 2004, inspired by Chris Hoy's success in the sport at the 2004 Summer Olympics in Athens.

In 2008 he was national youth champion and broke Hoy's British 200m record for his age group. Later that year he was the inaugural winner of the Chris Hoy Trophy, an award presented to Edinburgh's most promising young track cyclist, and received the award from Hoy himself.

Career
In 2010 Skinner joined British Cycling's Senior Academy. Skinner competed representing Scotland in the team sprint at the 2010 Commonwealth Games, finishing fourth. The following year he took two medals at the Under-23 European Track Championships, winning a bronze in the individual sprint and a silver in the team sprint alongside Peter Mitchell and Philip Hindes. He did not get the opportunity to compete at the 2012 Summer Olympics in London due to a lump in his neck in late 2011 which doctors initially thought was lymphoma. Biopsies later proved that the lump was not cancerous but the scare had caused him to take time away from the sport. He was subsequently promoted to the British Cycling Olympic Podium Programme in 2013.

In January 2014 he won his first World Cup medal, placing third in the team sprint in Guadalajara, and once again represented Scotland at the Commonwealth Games. He came to prominence at the 2014 British National Track Championships, winning a clean sweep of four national sprint titles. In October 2014, he became European champion in the 1 km time trial.

In January 2016 Skinner was a member of the team that won the overall title for the men's team sprint at the UCI Track Cycling World Cup in Hong Kong. In March he finished eighth in the individual sprint in the 2016 UCI Track Cycling World Championships in London.

At the 2016 Summer Olympics he was part of the team that won gold in the men's team sprint along with Philip Hindes and Jason Kenny, setting an Olympic record of 42.440 in the final against New Zealand. He won the silver medal in the men's individual sprint, beating Matthew Glaetzer 2–0 in the semi-final but he was beaten 2–0 by defending champion Kenny in an all-British final.

In a 2020 interview, Skinner stated that his mental health declined after the 2016 Olympics, culminating in what he described as a "mental breakdown" during the 2018 Commonwealth Games after he was disqualified from the keirin, although he did go on to take a medal in the kilometer time trial. He said that in 2019 he disclosed his mental health issues to a senior person at British Cycling, but that the official in question refused his request for time off to recover: he reflected that "that conversation finished me as a cyclist".

In February 2019 it was announced that Skinner had been appointed to the position of Lead Athlete with Global Athlete, a self-described "athlete-led movement for change" aiming to advance the interests of sportspeople: in this role he would be responsible for recruiting other athletes to the organisation. The following month he announced his retirement from competition in order to focus on advocating improvements in sportspeople's rights and working conditions. He also supports equality for LGBTQ athletes: both his father and brother are gay.

Major results

2011
 UEC European Track Championships (under-23 & junior)
 2nd  Team sprint (with Peter Mitchell and Philip Hindes)
 3rd  Sprint
2014
 1st  Kilo, UEC European Track Championships
 National Track Championships
1st   Kilo
1st   Keirin
1st   Sprint
1st   Team Sprint (with Philip Hindes & Jason Kenny)

 2013–2014 Track Cycling World Cup
3rd Team Sprint, Round 3

2014–15 Track Cycling World Cup
1st Team sprint (with Philip Hindes and Jason Kenny), Round 1

2016
 Olympic Games
1st  Team sprint
2nd  Sprint
 2015–16 Track Cycling World Cup
1st Team sprint (with Philip Hindes and Jason Kenny), Round 4

2017
2017–18 Track Cycling World Cup
2nd Team sprint (with Jack Carlin and Philip Hindes), Round 3
3rd 1km time trial, Round 2

2018
 3rd  1km time trial, Commonwealth Games

See also
City of Edinburgh Racing Club
Achievements of members of City of Edinburgh Racing Club

References

External links
 
 
 
 
 
 
 
 
 
 

1992 births
Living people
Scottish male cyclists
Scottish track cyclists
Olympic cyclists of Great Britain
Olympic gold medallists for Great Britain
Olympic silver medallists for Great Britain
Olympic medalists in cycling
Cyclists at the 2016 Summer Olympics
Medalists at the 2016 Summer Olympics
Commonwealth Games medallists in cycling
Commonwealth Games bronze medallists for Scotland
Cyclists at the 2010 Commonwealth Games
Cyclists at the 2014 Commonwealth Games
Cyclists at the 2018 Commonwealth Games
Scottish Olympic medallists
Scottish LGBT rights activists
Sportspeople with dyslexia
Cyclists from Glasgow
Medallists at the 2018 Commonwealth Games